Cyrille Dubois (born 27 September 1984)  is a French tenor performing as an opera and lieder singer.

Early life and education 
Cyrille Dubois spent his childhood in Ouistreham in Normandy, France. As a child he demonstrated an early talent for singing and joined the Maîtrise de Caen as a soprano where he read music and studied  the organ. At age 14 he was Miles in the Turn of the Screw at the Opéra de Lyon. In 2008 he was admitted to the Conservatoire de Paris and in 2010 to the Paris Opera workshop that gave him the opportunity to sing and play major opera parts.

Career 
In 2010 Dubois created the Duo Contraste with  pianist Tristan Raës. Together they have performed recitals in France at Opéra Bastille and other concert halls, such as in Venice, Italy,   at Wigmore Hall, England, and the Hermitage Theatre in St Petersburg, Russia.

In 2012 he portrayed Nathanaël in les Contes d'Hoffmann at La Scala. The following year he made his début with the Théatre de la Monnaie in Brussels as Azor in La Dispute, a contemporary opera by Benoît Mernier. A performance as Gérald in Lakmé followed. In 2014 he sang Oronte in Alcina,  Pâris in La Belle Hélène and was Coelio in les Caprices de Marianne by Henri Sauguet and toured around France.
In 2015, he performed as Narciso in Il Turco in Italia and made his début at the Glyndebourne Festival Opera in Maurice Ravel's L'heure espagnole. The same year he appeared as Brighella in Ariadne auf Naxos and Worker in Le Roi Arthus. In 2016 he performed as Marzio in Mitridate, re di Ponto and Belmonte in Die Entführung aus dem Serail.

Recent leading roles
 2017
 Lucien in Lucien Trompe-la-Mort, a contemporary opera by Luca Francesconi
 Don Ramiro in la Cenerentola. 
 2018
 Tavannes in Les Huguenots
 Horace in Le domino noir
 Tarare in the eponymous opera by Salieri
 Gérard de Coucy in Fromental Halevy's La Reine de Chypre
 2019
 Fortunio by André Messager
 Hippolyte in Hippolyte et Aricie by Jean-Philippe Rameau
 Ruodi in Guillaume Tell
 2021
 Dubois performed as Tamino in The Magic Flute at l'Opéra Bastille, Paris, a special  performance under Covid 19 restrictions.
 Dubois features L'Autre in Point d'Orgue, World creation by Thierry Escaich with librettist and stage director Olivier Py and soloists Patricia Petibon and Jean-Sébastien Bou.

Awards
 In 2010 the Duo Contraste won  first prize of the Lili and Nadia Boulanger competition.
In 2013 the Duo Contraste was awarded a further three prizes at  the Lyon Chamber Music Competition.
 In 2015 Dubois won the Opera Singer-Best Newcomer prize at les Victoires de la musique classique

Discography

Chamber music
 Les Clairières dans le ciel, Cyrille Dubois, ténor, Tristan Raës, piano. 2015Classica (magazine)
 Portrait de Félicien David, Mélodies conducted by Hervé Niquet, 2017
 LISZT :  "O LIEB!", lieder. Cyrille Dubois, ténor / Tristan Raës, piano.2018. Diapason d'Or et choc classica
 Mélodies de Lili et Nadia Boulanger, Cyrille Dubois, ténor/Tristan Raës, piano, 2020, choix de France Musique
 Canticles (Britten) : Cyrille Dubois (tenor) and Anne Le Bozec (piano) ; Wladimir Dubois (horn) ; Pauline Haas (harp) ; Marc Mauillon (baritone) ; Paul-Antoine Bénos-Djian (countertenor), 2020
 Alfred Bruneau, La nuit de mai with pianist Jeff Cohen , 2020

Opera 
Dubois has appeared as leading role on opera recordings such as Saint-Phar in Grétry's La Caravane du Caire conducted by Guy Van Waas; Marzio in Mozart's Mitridate conducted by Emmanuelle Haïm, Mercury in Lully, Persée 1770 with Hervé Niquet in 2017; title role of Pygmalion (Rameau) with Christophe Rousset, 2017; Iopas in Les Troyens (Hector Berlioz), 2017; title role in Tarare (Salieri) with Christophe Rousset; Curiace in les Horaces (Salieri) with Christophe Rousset, 2017;
Nadir in Les Pêcheurs de Perles (Bizet) with Alexandre Bloch, 2018 ; Gérard in La Reine de Chypre (Fromental Halévy) with Hervé Niquet, 2018; Colin in Le Devin du Village (Jean-Jacques Rousseau) with Sébastien d'Hérin, recorded at Versailles, 2018; title role in Fortunio (André Messager), 2019; Loti in L'île du Rêve (Reynaldo Hahn) with Hervé Niquet, 2020; Dardanus (Jean-Philippe Rameau) with György Vashegyi , 2021; L'Autre in Point-d'Orgue, music by Thierry Escaich, libretto and staging by Olivier Py, 2021;

Notes

References

External links 
 Official website

21st-century French male opera singers
French operatic tenors
Conservatoire de Paris alumni
1984 births
Living people